Rudi Lorch (born 20 January 1966) is a retired German football player. He spent three seasons in the Bundesliga with VfB Stuttgart.

Honours
 Bundesliga champion: 1983–84
 DFB-Pokal finalist: 1985–86

References

External links
 

1966 births
Living people
German footballers
Bundesliga players
VfB Stuttgart players
VfB Stuttgart II players
Association football midfielders